Nikyup is a village in Northern Bulgaria, in Veliko Tarnovo Province (Oblast Veliko Tarnovo), 194 km east of Sofia, Bulgaria's capital. The closest airport is in Gorna Oryahovitsa, 15 kilometers southeast.

Geography 
Nikyup is situated on the Rositsa river in the central part of the Danubian plain. The latest count of the population is 365 inhabitants. It is supposed that the year of establishment of the village is 1879. The remains of Nicopolis ad Istrum, an ancient Roman city, are situated three kilometers from the village, making it a popular tourist destination. In the Nikyup museum, several Roman archeological remains can be found, such as pillars, sarcophagi, and remains of marble edifices. A statue in the village center of commemorates the fallen warriors of Nikyup in numerous wars.

History 
The remains of Nicopolis ad Istrum is situated three kilometers north of Nikyup and eighteen kilometers north of Veliko Tarnovo. The first dating written text about the village is estimated to come from the 15th century.

Population 

Ethnic groups count in 2011:

References 

Villages in Veliko Tarnovo Province
15th-century establishments
1879 establishments in Bulgaria
Roman archaeology